is a Japanese former Nippon Professional Baseball outfielder.

References 

1949 births
Living people
Baseball people from Hyōgo Prefecture
Japanese baseball players
Nippon Professional Baseball outfielders
Kintetsu Buffaloes players
Managers of baseball teams in Japan
Osaka Kintetsu Buffaloes managers
Chunichi Dragons managers